"To-Search" is the debut single by the Japanese rock band Buck Tick. It was released on October 21, 1986 through the independent label Taiyo Records with the catalog number LEO 007. "To-Search" peaked at number 6 on the Japanese Indie Singles chart. The single's b-side, "Plastic Syndrome Type-2", was later featured on the group's debut studio album Hurry Up Mode in 1987, while "To-Search" was later released as the b-side to the "Just One More Kiss" single in 1988.

Track listing

Personnel
 Atsushi Sakurai - lead vocals
 Hisashi Imai[A] - lead guitar
 Hidehiko Hoshino - rhythm guitar
 Yutaka Higuchi - bass
 Toll Yagami - drums

Production
 Buck-Tick - producers
 Mamoru Tsukada - cover photo
 Tomoyo Tanaka - cover design

Notes

<li id="notea">^* In the liner notes, Imai is incorrectly credited as Kotobuki Imai.

References

Buck-Tick songs
1986 debut singles
1986 songs
Songs with music by Hisashi Imai